"Make My Life with You" is a song written by Gary Burr, and recorded by American country music group The Oak Ridge Boys.  It was released in November 1984 as the second single from their Greatest Hits 2 compilation album.  The song was The Oak Ridge Boys' eleventh number one on the country chart.  The single went to number one for one week and spent a total of fourteen weeks on the chart.

Charts

Weekly charts

Year-end charts

References

1984 singles
The Oak Ridge Boys songs
Songs written by Gary Burr
Song recordings produced by Ron Chancey
MCA Records singles
1984 songs